Kali Limenes may refer to:

 Kaloi Limenes, a port village in Crete
 , a coastal tanker built in 1944
 , a coastal tanker built in 1942